Arslanian may refer to:

 León Arslanián (born 1941), Argentine lawyer
 Sark Arslanian (1924–2016), former American football coach
 Dave Arslanian (born 1949), former college football head coach
 Paul-Louis Arslanian, French public servant
 Vatche Arslanian (1955–2003), member of the Canadian Red Cross in Iraq
 Armen Arslanian (born 1960), former Lebanese Olympic cyclist 
 Sirop Arslanian (born 1966), former Lebanese Olympic cyclist.

See also
 Aslanyan / Aslanian